In Ulster Rugby's fourth season since the advent of professionalism, they were champions of the Heineken Cup, and finished second in the IRFU Interprovincial Championship.

Harry Williams was appointed as Director of Rugby, signing a three-year full time contract, starting on 1 July when he resigned as principal of Holywood Primary School. A former prop for Malone and Bangor, Williams had coached Bangor to Ulster League and Cup titles in the 1980s. He was Ulster's coach for four years from 1987, and had led them to four unbeaten seasons in the Interprovincial Championship. He was part of the Irish development squad coaching team for their tour of New Zealand in 1993, and was Ireland A coach for three years. Most recently, he was coach of Dublin side Bective Rangers for 18 months, before resigning for family reasons at the end of 1998. Former Ireland fullback Colin Wilkinson was assistant coach, and Harry Brennan was strength and conditioning coach.

Warren Gatland, the new Ireland coach, led a drive by the IRFU to bring Irish players who had signed contracts with English clubs back to Ireland. Ulster were strengthened by the return of out-half David Humphreys and centre Mark McCall from London Irish, centre Jonny Bell and hooker Allen Clarke from Northampton, and lock Mark Blair from Edinburgh, but locks Paddy Johns and Jeremy Davidson rejected the IRFU approach, Johns staying at Saracens, Davidson moving from London Irish to Castres. Two English-born Irish internationals were also signed: fullback Simon Mason from Richmond, and prop Justin Fitzpatrick from London Irish.

The IRFU announced that the Irish provinces would have squads of 30 players, most of whom would be full-time professionals, for the coming season. The IRFU Ulster Branch signed 19 full-time players for the 1998–99 season, including Jonny Bell, Justin Fitzpatrick, Allen Clarke, David Humphreys, Simon Mason, Maurice Field, Denis McBride, Stephen Ritchie, James Topping and Gary Longwell, while younger players like Robin Morrow and Sheldon Coulter were signed to part-time contracts.

Mark McCall was named as captain, but sustained a career-ending injury in a friendly against Glasgow on 28 September.

Ulster's Heineken Cup campaign started with a draw against Edinburgh, followed by a heavy defeat away to Toulouse. When the players reacted with relief that the scoreline was not as extreme as the 108–16 defeat Toulouse had recently inflicted on Ebbw Vale, Williams was furious. Training was revamped: where previously the team had trained in the early mornings and evenings to accommodate part-time players, daytime sessions were introduced for full-time professionals, with one evening session a week for the part-timers. Ulster defeated Ebbw Vale, and then Toulouse at home, in front of Ravenhill's biggest crowd for several years, and were unbeaten for the remainder of the pool stage. With Ebbw Vale beating Toulouse 19–11 at home in their final game, Ulster topped the pool with an away win over Edinburgh.

They drew Toulouse at home in the quarter-finals. In the second half, with Ulster narrowly in the lead, flanker Andy Ward received word that his wife had gone into labour, and left the field, replaced by Derek Topping. Toulouse almost took the lead, if not for a late try-saving tackle on Michel Marfaing by David Humphreys, who injured his shoulder in the process. Bryn Cunningham replaced him, and Ulster held on to win. This was followed by a home semi-final against Stade Francais, with Ravenhill's capacity increased to 20,000 with temporary stands. It featured a memorable try from Humphreys – from his own 22, he chipped the ball forward to Sheldon Coulter, who passed it back to Humphreys to run it in from the halfway line – as well as five penalties, a conversion and a drop goal from Simon Mason, in a 33–27 victory. In the final, held at Lansdowne Road in Dublin, Ulster defeated Colomiers 21–6 to become the first Irish side to lift the Heineken Cup.

Squad

1998–99 Heineken Cup

Pool 3

Quarter-final

Semi-final

Final

1998–99 IRFU Interprovincial Championship

Top three teams qualify for next season's Heineken Cup.

Friendlies

Ulster Rugby Awards
The IRFU Ulster Branch Awards ceremony was held on 27 May 1999 at the Balmoral Conference Centre. Winners were:

Player of the year: Simon Mason
Guinness personality of the year: David Humphreys
Northern Bank coach of the year: Harry Williams
Renault schools player of the year: Bryan Young, Ballymena Academy
Calor Gas youth player of the year: David Cantley, Dromore
First Trust club of the year: Dungannon RFC
Dorrie B. Faulker Award: Joe Eagleson, competitions secretary

References

1998-99
1998–99 in Irish rugby union
1998–99 Heineken Cup